Hardik Tamore (born 20 October 1997) is an Indian cricketer. He made his first-class debut on 11 January 2020, for Mumbai in the 2019–20 Ranji Trophy. He made his Twenty20 debut on 19 January 2021, for Mumbai in the 2020–21 Syed Mushtaq Ali Trophy. He made his List A debut on 8 December 2021, for Mumbai in the 2021–22 Vijay Hazare Trophy.

References

External links
 

1997 births
Living people
Indian cricketers
Mumbai cricketers
Place of birth missing (living people)